The 2004–05 Celta de Vigo season was the club's 81st season in its history and its 27th participating in the Segunda División, the second tier of Spanish football.

Heading into the 2004–05 season, the Célticos were looking to return to La Liga after being relegated in the previous season. On the 18 June 2005, the Célticos gained promotion back to La Liga following a 2–0 victory over UE Lleida. Celta narrowly missed out on claiming the Segunda División title on goal difference to Cádiz CF.

Aside from the Segunda División, Celta were involved in the Copa del Rey where they were eliminated in the round of 64 by CD Tenerife.

Squad

First team squad
Source:

Left club during season

Competitions

Legend

Overall

Competition record

Segunda División

Matches

Copa del Rey

Matches

References

RC Celta de Vigo seasons
2004–05 in Spanish football leagues
2004–05 in European association football leagues